For the Love of Harry: Everybody Sings Nilsson, released on 9 May 1995 by Musicmasters, is a tribute album by various artists and dedicated to the songs of American musician Harry Nilsson. The album was released the year after Nilsson's death. Proceeds went to the Coalition to Stop Gun Violence.

Background
Shortly before Nilsson's 1993 heart attack, he was visited by Al Kooper of Blood, Sweat & Tears, who had previously recorded versions of Nilsson's "Without Her" and "Mournin’ Glory Story". Kooper learned of Nilsson's financial troubles and later met with producer Danny Kapilian with the idea of persuading Nilsson's friends and colleagues to record a tribute album in his honor. Nilsson gave his blessings for the project, and suggested that one of his favorite bands, Jellyfish, be included. The single from the album, "Coconut" performed by Fred Schneider, was produced by Richard Barone who joined Schneider to perform the song on Late Night with Conan O'Brien. Barone also contributed "I Guess the Lord Must Be in New York City" to the album.

A cover of the song “One” by Aimee Mann was used in the 1999 film Magnolia. The song is the opening track for the movie's soundtrack album.

Track listing

References

External links
For The Love of Harry: Everybody Sings Nilsson at The Harry Nilsson Web Pages

1995 albums
Harry Nilsson tribute albums